Eastwood Towne Center is an open-air shopping mall and lifestyle center located in Lansing Charter Township, Michigan, United States at the northwest corner of the intersection of Lake Lansing Road and U.S. 127.  Its anchor stores include NCG Cinemas, Dick's Sporting Goods, DSW Shoe Warehouse, and Pottery Barn. The center is owned, managed, and leased by Retail Properties of America.

Development & History
Developed by Jeffrey R. Anderson Real Estate and opened in 2002, as of 2017 Eastwood Towne Center includes "over 55 shops, services, [and] restaurants" and features a 19-screen cinema.  It includes 332,131 sq ft (30,856 sq m) of leasable space.

In March 2010 construction was planned to begin on a  expansion to the mall.  The $85 million expansion will include a new parking deck, condos, upscale apartments, additional shops and restaurants, and an addition to the NCG cinemas movie theater.  In June 2011 Lansing Township issued $22 million in bonds to cover some of the development costs and signed a lease for the  site.

See also
List of shopping malls in Michigan

References

External links
Shop Eastwood Towne Center (official site)

Shopping malls in Michigan
Shopping malls established in 2002
Buildings and structures in Ingham County, Michigan
Tourist attractions in Ingham County, Michigan
2002 establishments in Michigan